The Canadian Council on Animal Care (CCAC) is a Canadian organization that is responsible for "setting and maintaining standards for the care and use of animals in science" within the country. The organization provides ethical standards for the usage of nonhuman animals in laboratories. Its goal is to prevent harmful conduct on animals.

The CCAC was established in 1968 by the National Research Council at the request of the Medical Research Council. Its initial goal was to "investigate the care and use of experimental animals in Canada", with a mandate "to work for the improvement of animal care and use on a Canada-wide basis". The organization is a non-legislated, participatory, peer review system—all experimental care and use of animals in Canada is subject to its rules and regulations.

The organization explains its position on the use of animals in research:

The CCAC uses assessment panels, which meet with personnel from research institutions such as colleges and universities, to evaluate animal care and use within the facilities. While there, the panels interview individual investigators and observe specific techniques. If an institution does not meet the standards set by the CCAC, then the CCAC issues recommendations to the offending institution, typically for housekeeping or facility maintenance concerns.

Research in which vertebrates or cephalopods are used in Canada are subject to the requirements of the CCAC; however, research can be exempt if shown to be necessary. The CCAC was funded entirely by annual grants from the Medical Research Council and the Natural Sciences and Engineering Research Council, two of Canada's largest granting agencies, from the organization's inception in 1968 to 1994.

References

External links
 Official website

Animal welfare organizations based in Canada
Organizations established in 1968